The Fanimatrix (full title The Fanimatrix:  Run Program) is a science fiction/action fan film and short film based on The Matrix, released on the Internet on 27 September 2003, written and directed by Steven A. Davis and Rajneel Singh. It stars Steven A. Davis, Farrah Lipsham, Fasitua Amosa, and Vaughan Beckley.  Its name is a deliberate pun using the title The Animatrix and the term fan film.

Plot
The short film is set within the Matrix universe, shortly before the discovery of "The One" (in The Matrix).  It tells a story of two rebels, Dante and Medusa, operating out of a ship called the Descartes, and of their fateful mission onto the virtual world of the Matrix.

The film opens with the insertion of Dante and Medusa into the Matrix.  They materialize inside a machine-shop and quickly move across the city while talking to their Operator, who is guiding them on their mission.  The night's objectives are simple: Medusa is to break into a high-security building in order to steal important data.  Dante is to provide a distraction so the Matrix will not discover Medusa's presence.

Dante heads for a particularly rough nightclub populated with cyberpunks and goths.  After dispatching the two bouncers, he quickly picks a fight with two goths who mock Dante's "normal" appearance.  The Operator – who is in constant contact with Dante via his cellphone – helps coordinate the fight so it coincides with Medusa breaking into the high-security building and taking out a team of security officers.

The nightclub brawl culminates with Dante delivering a superhuman kick to one of goths, which alerts the Matrix.  The system promptly dispatches an Agent to take care of the situation and it begins chasing Dante.  He leads the Agent on a dangerous wild goose chase cross the city, keeping Medusa free to carry out her work.

Unfortunately things suddenly go wrong.  A security officer, missed by Medusa during her entry, discovers her presence and hits the alarm, meaning she has to flee.  Dante's goose chase now becomes a frantic dash to get to an exit point – the nearest being the machine shop they first appeared in, but he is unable to shake the Agent from his tail.

Dante is trapped and Medusa is out of time.  He realizes he must fight the Agent – even though it means certain death – in order to buy time for Medusa to escape with the information she's hacked.  He tells the Operator to get Medusa out and then, chanting the mantra "free my mind" to himself, he throws himself at the Agent. During an epic kung-fu fight he is able to hold off the Agent until he sees an opportunity to escape.  He decides, though, to not race to freedom, but continues the fight until he is eventually thrown against the machinery and his chest is pierced by a steel pipe, killing him.

As Dante dies, Medusa makes it back to the car and to safety – unaware of Dante's immense sacrifice for her own life.

Production
The Fanimatrix was filmed in New Zealand. With an estimated budget of $800NZ ($500US), most of which spent on wardrobe and props, the fan film was shot on a single CCD Sony camcorder on DV tape. Using guerrilla filmmaking techniques, the film-makers worked over the course of nine nights to finish the project.  The fight sequences were choreographed using the same wushu martial arts used in the feature films. The final product was edited on Adobe Premiere, AfterFX and AlamDV Special FX and premiered online on 27 September 2003, distributed via BitTorrent, Kazaa and the eDonkey network. As of 2022, it is the oldest torrent file still being actively distributed.

Cast
 Steven A. Davis as Dante
 Farrah Lipsham as Medusa
 Fasitua Amosa as The Operator
 Vaughan Beckley as The Agent
 Mike Edward as Bald Goth
 Chris Rigby as Contact Juggling Goth
 Ben Butler-Hogg as Bouncer #1
 Louis MacAllister as Bouncer #2
 Andrew Salisbury as Security Guard #1
 David Fraser as Security Guard #2
 Dominic Skinner as Security Guard #3
 Matt Bennett as Crow
 Eden Phillips as Pedestrian

References

External links
 Official website
 
 

2003 films
2003 independent films
2003 science fiction action films
2003 short films
Fan films
Films scored by Don Davis (composer)
Films scored by Andy Hunter (DJ)
Films shot in New Zealand
The Matrix (franchise)
Films about simulated reality
New Zealand science fiction action films
New Zealand independent films
2000s English-language films